The Nkwe ya Selefera - Silver Leopard, post-nominal letters NS, was instituted by the President of the Republic of South Africa on 16 April 2003 and came into effect on 27 April 2003. It is South Africa's second highest military decoration for bravery.

The South African military
The Union Defence Forces (UDF) were established in 1912 and renamed the South African Defence Force (SADF) in 1958. On 27 April 1994, it was integrated with six other independent forces into the South African National Defence Force (SANDF).

Institution
The Nkwe ya Selefera - Silver Leopard, post-nominal letters NS, was instituted by the President of South Africa on 16 April 2003 and came into effect on 27 April 2003. The bilingual title of the decoration is in Sesotho and English. This decoration replaced the Honoris Crux (HC) as South Africa's second highest military decoration for bravery. It is the middle award of a set of three military decorations for bravery, along with the Nkwe ya Gauta - Golden Leopard and the Nkwe ya Boronse - Bronze Leopard.

Award criteria
The Nkwe ya Selefera - Silver Leopard can be awarded to all ranks of the SANDF and of any Auxiliary Service of the SANDF, and of any Armed Forces attached to or serving with or rendering any service to the SANDF, who have distinguished themselves by performing acts of conspicuous bravery on a single occasion or over a period of time during military operations.

A Bar may be awarded for every subsequent action which would make recipients eligible for the award of the same decoration. The decoration and bar may be awarded posthumously.

Guidelines consisting of appropriate phrases, which may be useful when writing a citation for the award of the Nkwe ya Selefera - Silver Leopard, have been published by the South African Defence Department.
 Deliberate but daring and conspicuous actions on a single occasion or over a period of time.
 A dangerous, serious and/or critical situation.
 A possibility of loss of own life and/or endangered own life for others.
 Actions contributory to success.
 Perseverance under trying circumstances.

Order of wear

The position of the Nkwe ya Selefera - Silver Leopard in the official military and national orders of precedence is as follows:
  
Official military order of precedence
 Preceded by the Star for Bravery in Silver (SBS) of Umkhonto we Sizwe.
 Succeeded by the Pro Virtute Decoration (PVD) of the Republic of South Africa.

Official national order of precedence
 Preceded by the Star for Bravery in Silver (SBS) of Umkhonto we Sizwe.
 Succeeded by the Mendi Decoration for Bravery, Silver (MDS) of the Republic of South Africa.

Description
Obverse
The Nkwe ya Selefera - Silver Leopard is a five-armed cross pattée, struck in silver, with a diameter of 38 millimetres. The arms of the cross are bordered and the extremities embowed, with each pair of arms of the cross separated by three short rays. In the centre of the obverse is a light blue enamel roundel, 19 millimetres in diameter, with a silver leopard's head.

Reverse
The reverse bears, in relief, the Coat of arms of South Africa. The decoration is attached to a plain silver suspender, affixed to the upper arm of the decoration. The decoration number is stamped or engraved below the Coat of Arms.

Ribbon
The ribbon is 32 millimetres wide and sky blue, with 6 millimetres wide white edges. The blue represents the feathers of the blue crane, which Xhosa kings used to present to brave warriors.

Bar
The Bar for subsequent conferments of the Nkwe ya Selefera - Silver Leopard is 33 millimetres in length and 5 millimetres wide, struck in silver and embossed in the centre with a replica of the decoration. When only a ribbon bar is worn, a button replica of the decoration, 8 millimetres in diameter and struck in silver, is affixed to the ribbon bar.

Insignia
Award of the decoration for service in active military operations is indicated by distinguishing insignia, which indicate the arm of the service in which the recipient was serving at the time of the action for which the decoration was conferred. The insignia are struck in silver and is worn on the ribbon, above any bars which may have been awarded.
 Crossed swords for the South African Army.
 An eagle for the South African Air Force.
 An Anchor for the South African Navy.
 The Rod of Aesculapius for the South African Military Health Service.

Recipients
In respect of those recipients about whom it is available, the actions they were cited for follow below the table, since inclusion in the table itself is impractical.

Note 1:  denotes a posthumous award.

Actions cited for

References

Military decorations and medals of South Africa
Courage awards
2003 establishments in South Africa
Awards established in 2003